Kızılinler station is a small stop along the Eskişehir-Konya railway. Passenger traffic is very low and the station is mainly used as a siding to allow trains to pass one-another.

References

External links
Turkish State Railways

Railway stations in Eskişehir Province